Kilcullen is an Intermediate Gaelic Athletic Association (GAA) club in Kilcullen, County Kildare, Ireland, which played a leading role in developing the games in the county.

History
Kilcullen town sports predate the GAA. The club was founded in 1889, and at first wore green and gold. They changed to black and white to honour the New Zealand national rugby union team ("All Blacks"), who played in Dublin in 1905. Their nickname, "The Rags", comes from a friendly game against Isles of the Sea where the Dubliners insulted the Kilcullen team's shabby kit.

The club crest depicts the round tower of Old Kilcullen, with its distinctive uneven top.

Gaelic football
Kilcullen were beaten by Clane in the 1892 county final. They lost to Moorefield 0-2 to 2-11 in the 1962 final.

Ladies Gaelic football
Kilcullen Ladies won their first ever Championship at senior level on 3 September 2016. They defeated Celbridge in the final of the Junior B Championship with a final scoreline of 5-17 to 2-05. 
Kilcullen Line-Up:  Aoife Molyneaux;  Laura McMahon, Karen Bell, Amy Moran;  Katie Willis, Dáire Smyth, Bróna Dooley;  Lisa Aspell, Lorraine Schwer(Capt);  Kate Timmons, Jayne Peacocke(0-6,5f), Sinéad Maher;  Clare Kelly(0-1), Nanci Murphy(3-4), Ciara Pembroke(1-5).
Subs used: Ellie O'Toole(1-1), Sarah Doherty(0-1), Emily Vaughan, Rachel Hovenden-Keane, Avril Glendon.  
Other subs: Amy Barker, Sinéad Jones

The Ladies section of the club had a year of unprecedented success in 2018, the club won at Division 1 level in all age groups from U13, U14, U15, U16 and Minor. The U14s won the All Ireland B Feile. And to round off the success the Senior side added the club's second ever Ladies Senior championship by defeating Na Fianna in the Ladies Junior A final.

The Ladies now compete at Intermediate level with a huge pool of talent running through the underage system in the club including a number of players lining out for Kildare at various levels. Three 'Ragettes' were on the successful Kildare Minor Ladies All Ireland B Championship winning side of 2018: Nanci Murphy, Brona Dooley and Molly Aspell. Molly Aspell is also now the Kildare minor captain for 2019.

Camogie
Michelle Aspell was selected on the Kildare camogie team of the century.

Honours
 Kildare Senior Football Championship: Finalists 1892. 1917. 1962.
 Kildare Intermediate Football Championship: (5) 1945, 1956, 1961, 1976, 1998
 Kildare Junior Football Championship: (7) 1914, 1943, 1953, 1971, 1997, 2016, 2021
 Leinster Junior Club Football Championship: (1) 1997  Runner-Up 2021
 Kildare Ladies Junior A Championship (1) 2018
 Kildare Ladies Junior B Championship (1) 2016
 Kildare Minor Ladies Division 1 (1) 2018
 Jack Higgins Cup (3) 1953, 1971, 1997
 Kildare Under-21 B Football Championship (1) 2003
 Kildare Under-21 D Football Championship (1) 2015
 Keogh Cup Champions (1) 2010
 Kildare Intermediate 'B' Football Championship (1)  2010
 Kildare Junior 'B' Football Championship (1) 1970
 Kildare Under 16 B Championship (2) 2008, 2014
 All Ireland Feile B Girls Championship (1) 2018

Bibliography
 Kilcullen Gaelic Athletic Association 1889 1984 by Arty Aspell. Kilcullen GAA Nd, 75pp.
 Kildare GAA: A Centenary History, by Eoghan Corry, CLG Chill Dara, 1984,  hb  pb
 Kildare GAA yearbook, 1972, 1974, 1978, 1979, 1980 and 2000- in sequence especially the Millennium yearbook of 2000
 Soaring Sliothars: Centenary of Kildare Camogie 1904-2004 by Joan O'Flynn Kildare County Camogie Board.

References

External links
Kilcullen GAA Club

Kildare GAA site
Kildare GAA club sites
Kildare on Hoganstand.com

Kilcullen
Gaelic games clubs in County Kildare
Gaelic football clubs in County Kildare